Calvano is an Italian surname. Notable people with the surname include:

Anthony Calvano (born 1982), American soccer player
Sadie Calvano (born 1997), American actress
Simone Calvano (born 1993), Italian footballer
Tiago Calvano (born 1981), Brazilian footballer

Italian-language surnames